Admetella longipedata is a scale worm that occurs widely in the Indian, Pacific and Atlantic Oceans at depths of 400–6,000m.

Description
Admetella longipedata has 82 segments and 31 pairs of elytra. The lateral antennae are inserted terminally on anterior margin of prostomium, with auxiliary appendages at the base of the lateral antennae. Notochaetae are thinner than neurochaetae and bidentate neurochaetae are absent

References

Phyllodocida
Animals described in 1885